The Structure and Biology of Arctic Flowering Plants is a classical scientific work on morphology and anatomy in relation to the harsh arctic environment. It was initiated by Eugenius Warming and conducted by himself and a suite of students and colleagues at the University of Copenhagen.

Warming, E. ed. (1908-1921) The structure and biology of Arctic flowering plants.
 Meddelelser om Grønland, 36,
Warming, E. (1908) 1. Ericinæ (Ericaceae, Pirolaceae). 1. Morphology and biology, p. 1-71.
 Petersen, H.E. (1908) 1. Ericinæ (Ericaceae, Pirolaceae). 2. The biological anatomy of them leaves and stems, p. 73-138.
 Petersen, H.E. (1908) 2. Diapensiaceae. Diapensia lapponica, p. 139-154.
 Mentz, A. (1909) 3. Empetraceae. Empetrum nigrum, p. 155-167.
 Warming, E. (1909) 4. Saxifragaceae. 1. Morphology and biology, p. 169-236.
 Galløe, O. (1909) 4. Saxifragaceae. 2. The biological leaf-anatomy of the Arctic species of Saxifraga, p. 237-294.
 Seidelin, A. (1909) 5. Hippuridaceae, Halorrhagidaceae and Callitrichaceae, p. 295-332.
 Jessen, K. (1909) 6. Ranunculaceae, p. 334-440.
 Heide, F. (1909) 7. Lentibulariaceae, 441–481.
 Meddelelser om Grønland, 37,
 Jessen, K. (1913) 8. Rosaceæ, p. 1-126.
 Olsen, C. (1914) 9. Cornaceae, p. 127-150.
 Hagerup, O. (1915) 10. Caprifoliaceae. Linnaea borealis L., p. 151-164.
 Mathiesen, F.J. (1916) 11. Primulaceae, p. 165-220.
 Warming, E. (1920) 13. Caryophyllaceæ, p. 229-342.
 Porsild, M.P. (1920) 14. Liliales, p. 343-358.
 Mathiesen, F.J. (1921) 15. Scrophulariaceae, 359–507.

References

Flora of Greenland
Flora of the Arctic
Botany books
Arctic